RealityXtra (formerly CBS Drama) is a British free-to-air television channel that centres its programming on American television shows produced by CBS. It is the sister channel of CBS Reality and is owned in partnership by AMC Networks and Paramount Networks.

History

CBS Drama
On 14 September 2009, it was revealed that the international arm of CBS, CBS Studios International, struck a joint venture deal with Chellomedia to launch six CBS-branded channels in the UK during 2009. The new channels would replace Zone Romantica, Zone Thriller, Zone Horror and CBS Reality, plus timeshift services Zone Horror +1 and Zone Reality +1. On 1 October 2009, it was announced that CBS Reality, CBS Reality +1, CBS Drama and CBS Justice (replacing CBS Action in 2018) would launch on 16 November 2009 replacing Zone Reality, Zone Reality +1, Zone Romantica and Zone Thriller. On 5 April 2010, Zone Horror and Zone Horror +1 were rebranded by Horror Channel and Horror Channel +1, following the rebrand of the portfolio's other three channels in November 2009.

On 1 August 2012 Chellomedia revealed that all European versions of the Zone Channels would be rebranded into CBS Channels. CBS Drama replaced Zone Romantica on 3 December 2012 (in Poland replaced Zone Club).

CBS Reality launched on Freeview on 1 April 2014 followed by CBS Action on 1 October 2014 and as of July 2014, CBS Reality +1, CBS Action, CBS Drama & Horror Channel are available on the YouView platform as part of TalkTalk TV's Entertainment Boost, but were removed from the EPG on 2 June 2015.

CBS Drama closed in Poland on 31 December 2016. It had broadcast UK shows such as Bad Girls, Waterloo Road and Footballers Wives, American shows such as Dallas, Beverly Hills, 90210, CSI and Knots Landing, as well as Australian shows such as Return To Eden and Bondi Rescue.

RealityXtra
On 30 June 2022, the British arm of the AMC-Paramount partnership revised their channel line-up with all CBS branding, with the exception of CBS Reality, being dropped and new channel Legend taking CBS Justice's slot and Horror's programming. In the reshuffle, CBS Drama was renamed Reality Xtra, becoming a sister channel to the current (CBS) Reality channel.

With the rebrand and reshuffle of channels, RealityXtra changed frequencies on Freeview and became a limited-reach channel for viewers who could receive the range of Local channels on channel 7 or 8.

Current programming on RealityXtra

Bonanza (Also shown on Spotlight TV)
CSI: Miami
CSI: NY
Dr. Quinn, Medicine Woman
Dynasty
ER
JAG
Judge Judy
The Love Boat
Medium
Touched by an Angel
Bad Girls
Beauty and the Beast
Beverly Hills, 90210
Bondi Rescue
Boston Legal
Charmed
Cheers (Seasons 1–4 only) (Now on Channel 4)
The Colbys
Cutting It
Dallas
Days of Our Lives
The Division
Diagnosis: Murder
Ed
Falcon Crest
Footballer's Wives
Guiding Light
Hack
The Jerry Springer Show
Judge Joe Brown
Judging Amy
Keen Eddie
Knots Landing
The Last Frontier
Matlock
Melrose Place
Mile High
Models Inc.
Moonlighting
North and South
Outrageous Fortune
Party of Five
Playing the Field
The Practice
Return to Eden
Sex and the City
Sex, Love & Secrets
Shogun
Sunset Beach (Seasons 1 and 2 only)
The Streets of San Francisco
Taxi
That's Life
The Thorn Birds
Twin Peaks
Waterloo Road
Wheel of Fortune
The Young and the Restless

RealityXtra2

RealityXtra2 launched on 26 October 2022 on Freeview channel 69. As of 27 October 2022, RealityXtra2 only broadcasts two episodes of Donal MacIntyre's Murder Files from 3:00am until 5:00am and is deemed to be a placeholder channel. RealityXtra2 uses the on-screen bug of the RealityXtra channel (CBS Justice from 26 October until 11 November) but with the channel ident used on-air.

Current programming on RealityXtra2

Donal MacIntyre's Murder FilesWritten in Blood
''The Real Prime Suspect

See also
CBS Reality
CBS Justice
CBS Europa
Paramount International Networks
AMC Networks International
Blue Ant Extreme
Blue Ant Entertainment

References

External links
CBS Drama

AMC Networks International
Paramount International Networks
Television channels and stations established in 2009
English-language television stations in the United Kingdom
2009 establishments in the United Kingdom